Fraser is a Scottish surname, connected to the Clans Fraser and Fraser of Lovat. It is most commonly found in the United Kingdom, Canada, the United States, Australia, and New Zealand.

Notable people with the surname include:

A
Adam Fraser (1871–1???), Scottish footballer
Alasdair Fraser (born 1955), Scottish fiddler
Alec Fraser (disambiguation), multiple people
Alex Fraser (disambiguation), multiple people
Alexander Fraser (disambiguation), multiple people
Alistair Fraser (1885–1964), Canadian politician
Alison Fraser (born 1955), American actress and singer
Allan Fraser (disambiguation), multiple people
Andrew Fraser (disambiguation), multiple people
Andy Fraser (1952–2015), English musician and songwriter, member of the rock band Free
Angus Fraser (born 1965), former English international cricketer
Lady Antonia Fraser (born 1932), British author
Archibald Campbell Fraser of Lovat (1736–1815), British consul
Arvonne Fraser (1925–2018), American politician and writer

B
Barbara Wall Fraser, American politician from Missouri
Barry Fraser (1940–2022), Canadian ice hockey executive
Benton Fraser, fictional character in the TV series Due South
Bernie Fraser (disambiguation), multiple people
Bill Fraser (disambiguation), multiple people
Bonnie Fraser (born 1990), lead singer of Australian pop-punk band Stand Atlantic
Brad Fraser (born 1959), Canadian playwright
Brendan Fraser (born 1968), Canadian-American actor
Brooke Fraser (born 1983), New Zealand singer-songwriter
Bruce Fraser (disambiguation), multiple people

C
Carol Hoorn Fraser (1930–1991), figurative artist
Charles Fraser (disambiguation), multiple people
Chick Fraser (1873–1940), American Major League Baseball pitcher
Christine Marion Fraser (1938–2002), Scottish author
Christopher Fraser (born 1965), British Conservative Member of Parliament
Christopher Finlay Fraser (1839–1894), Canadian lawyer and politician
Christopher Neil Fraser (born 1974), British-born Australian businessman
Colin Fraser (born 1985), Canadian ice hockey player

D
Daniel Fraser (disambiguation), multiple people
David Fraser (disambiguation), multiple people
Dawn Fraser (born 1937), Australian swimmer
Donald Fraser (disambiguation), multiple people
Donna Fraser (born 1972), English track athlete
Doug Fraser (disambiguation), multiple people
Douglas Fraser (1916–2008), American union leader
Douglas M. Fraser (born 1953), American general
Drew Fraser (born 1944), Canadian academic
Duncan Fraser (disambiguation), multiple people
Dane Fraser 1987

E
Eadie Fraser (1860–1886), Scottish footballer
Elisabeth Fraser (1920–2005), American actress
Eliza Fraser, Scottish shipwreck survivor (1836)
Elizabeth Fraser (born 1963), Scottish singer
Eric Fraser (disambiguation), multiple people
Etty Fraser (1931–2018), Brazilian actress
Evan Fraser of Balconie

F
Flora Fraser (disambiguation), multiple people
Francis Fraser (disambiguation), multiple people
Frankie Fraser (1923–2014), British gangster and ex-convict once dubbed 'the most dangerous man in Britain'
Frank L. Fraser (1854–1935), American politician
Franklin D. Fraser (1819–1879), Florida supreme court justice

G
George Fraser (disambiguation), multiple people
Giles Fraser (born 1964), Anglican priest
Gordon Fraser (disambiguation) or Gord Fraser, multiple people
Graham Fraser (born 1946), Canadian journalist

H
Hadley Fraser (born 1980), English actor and singer
Harold Fraser (disambiguation), multiple people
Harry Fraser (disambiguation), multiple people
Helen Fraser (disambiguation), multiple people
Henk Fraser (born 1966), Dutch footballer
Henry Fraser (disambiguation), multiple people
Herbert MacKay-Fraser (1927–1957), American racing driver
 Hew Fraser (1877–1938), Scottish field hockey player
Honor Fraser (born 1974), American art dealer
Hugh Fraser (disambiguation), multiple people

I
Iain Fraser (disambiguation), multiple people
Ian Fraser (disambiguation), multiple people
Isaac Fraser (1779–1858), Canadian politician

J
Jack Fraser (disambiguation), multiple people
James Fraser (disambiguation), multiple people
Jill Fraser (1946–2006), British theatre owner and director
Jim Fraser (disambiguation), multiple people
J. Keith Fraser (born 1922), Canadian geographer
Jo Fraser, British artist
Jo Fraser, South Australian ceramicist and co-creator of Yerrakartarta art installation in Adelaide
Joan Fraser (born 1944), Canadian senator
John Fraser (disambiguation), multiple people
Josh Fraser (born 1982), Australian rules footballer
Julian Fraser (born 1950), a British Virgin Islands politician
Juliette May Fraser (1887–1983), American artist
Julius Thomas Fraser (1923–2010), interdisciplinarian scholar of time

K
Karen Fraser (born 1944), Washington State Senator
Katharine Fraser, Mistress of Saltoun (born 1957)
Kathleen Fraser (disambiguation), multiple people
Keath Fraser (born 1944), Canadian author
Keith Fraser (disambiguation), multiple people
Kelly Fraser (1993–2019), Inuk-Canadian Inuktitut-language singer-songwriter
Kerry Fraser (born 1952), Canadian ice hockey referee
Kristin Fraser (born 1980), American ice dancer

L
Laura Fraser (born 1976), Scottish actress
Leo Fraser (1926–2013), American lawyer, businessman and politician
Lindley M. Fraser (1904–1963), British economist
Liz Fraser (1930–2018), English actress
Louis Fraser (1810–1866), British zoologist
Louis James Fraser (before 1870?–before 1917?), Scottish pioneer in Malaysia, see: Fraser's Hill

M
Malcolm Fraser (disambiguation), multiple people
Marcus Fraser (golfer) (born 1978), Australian golfer
Marcus Fraser (footballer) (born 1994), Scottish footballer
Mark Fraser (disambiguation), multiple people
Marion Fraser (1932–2016), Scottish music educator
Martin Fraser (born 1970), Irish civil servant
Mary Isabel Fraser (1863–1942), New Zealand teacher and advocate for girls' education
Mat Fraser (born 1962), British rock musician and actor
Mathew Fraser (born 1990) American CrossFit athlete
Matthew Fraser (journalist) (born 1958), Canadian journalist
Michael Fraser (basketball), (born 1984), Canadian player
Moyra Fraser (1923–2009), British actress
Murdo Fraser (born 1965), Scottish politician

N
Nancy Fraser (born 1947), American philosopher and political theorist
Neale Fraser (born 1933), former Australian tennis player
Neil Fraser (disambiguation), multiple people

P
Paul Fraser (born 1955), British Entrepreneur
Paula Newby-Fraser (born 1962), Zimbabwean ironman athlete
Peter Fraser (disambiguation), multiple people
Phyllis Fraser (1916–2006), American actress

Q
Quentin Stafford-Fraser, British computer scientist

R
Raymond Fraser (1941–2018), Canadian author
Richard Fraser (disambiguation), multiple people
Robert Fraser (disambiguation), multiple people
Robin Fraser (born 1966), Jamaican soccer player
Ron Fraser (1933–2013), American college baseball coach
Ronald Fraser (disambiguation), multiple people

S
Sally Fraser (1932–2019), American actress
 Sarah Fraser (died 1880), Australian brothel keeper
Scott Fraser (disambiguation), multiple people
Sean Fraser (disambiguation), multiple people
Sheila Fraser (born 1950), Auditor General of Canada
Shelly-Ann Fraser (born 1986), Jamaican sprinter
Shelagh Fraser (born 1920), English actress
Simon Fraser (disambiguation), multiple people
Steve Fraser (born 1958), American Olympic Greco-Roman wrestler
Stuart Fraser (disambiguation), multiple people
Suzie Fraser (born 1983), Australian water polo player
Sylvia Fraser (born 1935), Canadian novelist and travel writer

T
Thomas Fraser (disambiguation), multiple people
Tom Fraser (1911–1988), British politician
Tommy Fraser (born 1987), English footballer
Tomiko Fraser (born 1968), American actress and fashion model

W
William Fraser (disambiguation), multiple people

See also
 Lord Fraser, in the Peerage of Scotland
 Baron Fraser of Allander
 Frasers of Philorth, a Scottish family
 Frasier (disambiguation)
 Frazer (name)
 Frazier (disambiguation)
 Fraser syndrome

References

English-language surnames
Scottish surnames
Surnames of Lowland Scottish origin